Benidorm is a city, town and municipality in the province of Alicante, Valencia, on the Mediterranean coast of Spain.

Benidorm has been a tourist destination within Spain since 1925, when its port was extended and the first hotels were built, though it would not be until the 1950s that it became renowned as a summer destination for people coming from inland Spain, especially Madrid. Today it is known for its hotel industry, beaches, and skyscrapers and receives as many tourists from abroad as from Spain. According to the 2020 census, Benidorm has a permanent population of 70,450 inhabitants, making it the fifth-most populous town in the Alicante province and the ninth in Valencian Community.

History
It is thought there were settlements in the Benidorm area possibly as far back as 3000 BC, including evidence of Roman and Punic remains. However, settlements in the area were small and it was not until the arrival of the Moors that the local population began to grow during the era of the Umayad dynasty. The Christian King James I of Aragon reconquered the region in 1245 and Benidorm first officially became known in 1325, when Admiral Bernat de Sarrià of Polop awarded it a town charter as a way of removing the Moors and allowing Christians to inhabit the area. Strategically, the town was also used by Bernat de Sarrià to stop the rising power of Admiral Roger of Lauria, lord of Altea, in the south of the Kingdom of Valencia.

Benidorm's history for the next few centuries was plagued by attacks from the sea by Ottoman and Barbary pirates. The 17th century saw conditions improve for Benidorm and its people, most notably with the construction of an advanced irrigation system in 1666 to channel water to the region. By the 18th century Benidorm fishermen had become famous and sought after all over Spain and beyond. Tuna was their main catch and they perfected the ancient almadraba technique dating from Islamic times. The success of the fishing industry, together with improved local agriculture, helped to fuel a strong local economy. Coastal traffic increased too, bringing more wealth to the region with the town becoming a base for sea captains and the building of their vessels.

In 1952 Benidorm's fishing industry went into decline; this was a factor in encouraging the town council to approve many new development plans aimed at the tourist market.

Local politics

After giving the Spanish Socialist Workers' Party majorities or pluralities in elections from the restoration of democracy in 1977, Benidorm has favoured the right wing People's Party (PP) since the general elections of 1993. The PP gained control of the local council at the 1995 local elections and won 14 of the 25 council seats in the 1999 and 2003 elections. The 2007 election gave them a one-seat majority over the PSOE, but disagreements in the PP group led to a motion of censure being passed against the PP mayor in September 2009. He was replaced by the socialist Agustín Navarro. In 2019, PP won the local elections, obtaining an absolute majority.  
 
As of the 2019 local elections, the political composition on the local council was the following:

Geography

The town is divided into five parts: Poniente (Ponent or 'sun setting') and Levante (Llevant or 'sun rising'), each fronted by a beach of the same name; the old town (also called El Castell); La Cala situated to the west side of Poniente; and El Rincón de Loix (or El Racó de l'Oix) situated to the east side of Levante. Between the two beaches lies a rocky promontory and the port.

The old city occupies the promontory and the area immediately inland, while most of the hotels occupy the more recently developed sections inland from the two beaches. A few miles from shore is an uninhabited island known as Benidorm Island or Peacock Island (due to previously having a peacock enclosure) which provides a dramatic centrepiece to the seascape.

In 1954 Pedro Zaragoza Orts, the then young Mayor of Benidorm, created the Plan General de Ordenación (city building plan) that ensured, via a complex construction formula, every building would have an area of leisure land, guaranteeing a future free of the excesses of cramped construction seen in other areas of Spain. It is the only city in Spain that still adheres to this rigid rule. Most of the streets in the city are named after places such as Avenida de Uruguay, Avenida del Mediterráneo, Calle Pekín, etc. Avenida del Mediterráneo is a wide avenue that crosses Levante and links the old town with Rincón. Avenida Europa crosses Levante at right angles linking the western city limits with the Levante beach.

Benidorm is connected to the FGV railway line between Alicante (Alacant) and Dénia. The section to Alicante is now converted to tram operation and trams run at least every half an hour between Benidorm and Alicante (see Alicante Tram). Trains run hourly from Benidorm to Dénia (via towns of Altea and Calp), connecting with the trams at Benidorm station.

Climate
Benidorm has a hot semi-arid climate (Köppen: BSh) with mild winters and hot summers. The city receives slightly more than 300 mm in precipitation per year and the wettest season is the mid-late autumn, which prevents it from being classified as Mediterranean. The temperature oscillation is small, being even smaller during summers, during the summer the maximum temperatures normally range from 28 to 32 °C while the lows range from 20 to 24 °C. In almost all of the summer months the average city minimum temperatures at night remain above 20 °C (68 °F), a phenomenon referred to as tropical night.

Tourism

Benidorm is popular with tourists from the UK, Ireland, Poland, Belgium and the Netherlands. Benidorm's initial growth in popularity can be attributed to the package holiday explosion, and continues year round, due to the night-life based around the central concentration of bars and clubs. The large number of free cabaret acts that start around 21:00 and continue into the early hours sets Benidorm apart from other similar cities.

The author and Guardian journalist Giles Tremlett identified the city as the birthplace of package tourism in the book Ghosts of Spain: Travels Through a Country's Hidden Past and remarked that culturally the city contradicted conservative notions of National Catholicism that General Franco had espoused. The accessibility of Benidorm to a wider social strata made the town into an ever so easy target for highbrow sarcasm, as by Jani Allan in the Sunday Times in 1990: "These days you just have to look at the numbers of wide-bodied jets bearing wide-bodied holidaymakers to Benidorm to realise that package holidays and airborne cattle trucks make fun in the sun accessible to everyone."

In the 1980s Benidorm developed a reputation for British drunken lager louts and violent binge drinking. This did not happen all year round but mainly in the summer months of July and August. During the 1980s families were put off visiting the city. However today the problem of drunkenness and lager louts has largely gone and Benidorm has mellowed. Now there is a good police presence in the town which has greatly improved safety and provided for a good atmosphere. Nightlife is popular and mainly involves cabaret acts and tapas bars.

The town is now very popular with families. Also, many elderly people from northern Europe pass the winter there. This made 'Benidorm' into something of a synonym for elderly people in those countries, as can be seen in the Flemish candid camera programme Benidorm Bastards.

Benidorm has three major beaches: Playa de Levante (Valencian: Platja de Llevant), Playa de Poniente (Valencian: Platja de Ponent) and Playa de Mal Pas (Valencian: Platja del Mal Pas); all of them have had a blue flag since 1987, the maximum quality standard recognised by the European Union. The Gran Hotel Bali, a four-star hotel located in this city since 2002, is a 186-metre-tall building which stood as the tallest skyscraper in Spain for five years, until it was surpassed by the CTBA towers in Madrid and Intempo building, also in Benidorm. Intempo building is currently the fifth tallest of Spain and the tallest building in the Valencian Community.

Events and attractions
Each summer, since 1959 to 2000, the city celebrated the Benidorm International Song Festival, a song contest where international or Spanish celebrities such as Julio Iglesias, Raphael or the Dúo Dinámico became famous. Loosely based on the song festival, RTVE signed, in 2021, a four-year contract with the city of Benidorm to hold the preselection to determine the Spanish entry for the Eurovision Song Contest, naming the event Benidorm Fest.

Since 2010, in July, Benidorm celebrates an indie music festival, with national and international music groups, called "Benidorm Low Festival". In 2019, a counterpart of Primavera Sound, Primavera Weekender, premiered at Magic Robin Hood Camp.

In 2011, Benidorm hosted the start of the Vuelta a España, one of cycling's three grand tours.

Benidorm is home to annual open water swimming competition of Oceanman series.

Benidorm boasts three family-oriented theme parks: Terra Mítica is inland from the city, at the foot of the mountain, and Aqualandia and Mundomar are located on the outskirts of the city on the Levante side. Benidorm offers activities for all ages. With all the family attractions available, Benidorm has been described as one of the most family-oriented holiday destinations in Spain and Europe. In addition to large shopping and commercial areas. An episode of the hit British sitcom Only Fools and Horses was set in Benidorm. The episode was called "It Never Rains...".
 
A TV series called Benidorm has aired on ITV (with replays on ITV2) in the UK. Actors include Jake Canuso, Steve Pemberton, Sheila Reid and comedian Johnny Vegas. Airing of the tenth series began in February 2018. In 2020 a Spanish comedy series of the same name starring Antonio Pagudo and María Almudéver premiered on Atresplayer Premium.

Demographics

Nationality
Benidorm is one of the most culturally diverse cities in Europe with a high immigrant population. The population in 2010 was 71,198. These figures are for those registered as formal residents and not long-term visitors.

Population growth

Education

The École française Pablo Picasso, an annex of the Lycée Français d'Alicante, a French international school, is located in Benidorm.

See also
 Benidorm Island
 List of tallest buildings in Benidorm

Notelist

References

External links 
 
 
 Benidorm City Council

 
Municipalities in the Province of Alicante
Seaside resorts in Spain
Marina Baixa
Populated coastal places in Spain